Stone House is a Grade II listed building in the civil parish of High Abbotside, near Hawes, North Yorkshire, England.

History
Stone House was built as a private house for Hugh Arden Crallan (1867–1929). He chose the architect Percy Richard Morley Horder and the house was built in 1909. Crallan was a keen cricketer and set up the Hawes Cricket Club. He employed a gardener at his house, Percy Jeeves, who was a famous bowler and the inspiration for the character Jeeves in the P.G. Wodehouse novels.

Crallan was a keen meteorologist and regularly reported rain fall measurements from Stone House.

After the death of Hugh Crallan in 1929 his widow, Edith continued to live in the house until her death in December 1938.

After a succession of owners, in 1980 the house was sold and in 1981 became a hotel. The building has been expanded since with additional accommodation, but retains much of its historic interior fittings.

References

Grade II listed buildings in North Yorkshire
Arts and Crafts architecture in England
Houses completed in 1909
Hotels in North Yorkshire
Richmondshire